Mountjoy is a fictional mutant character appearing in American comic books published by Marvel Comics. The character first appeared in Bishop: The Mountjoy Crisis #1.

Fictional character biography
Mountjoy is a mutant who was trained by the Emplates to merge with another person's body in order to feed. Originally from the same future as Bishop, Mountjoy went through one of Trevor Fitzroy’s time portals while inside the body of Bantam. He then left Bantam after he arrived. After, when Fitzroy was presumed dead, Mountjoy hunted down Bantam for he was the only one who knew of Mountjoy's presence. Chasing Bantam, Mountjoy encountered Bishop, whose sister Shard once captured and imprisoned Mountjoy in their future. Mountjoy defeated Bishop while merging with Storm and using her as a hostage. Mountjoy then released Storm and escaped. Later, Mountjoy was found by Bishop at a New York Police Station. While chasing each other downtown, Mountjoy ambushed and absorbed Bishop. Arriving at the X-Mansion in Bishop's body, Mountjoy divested Bishop and went after the other X-Men. He found and absorbed Archangel, Gambit and Psylocke. Mountjoy was then lured into the Danger Room by Shard. Inside the Danger Room, Mountjoy fought off Bishop with powers from the three X-Men he absorbed. Not knowing the Shard was a hologram, Mountjoy tried to absorb her but couldn't. Shard held Mountjoy in place as Bishop fired an energy blast at him. The blast forced Mountjoy to let go of Archangel, Gambit and Psylocke, and he was defeated.

Mountjoy would later infiltrate the Inner Circle of the London Hellfire Club, and merge inside the Circle's recorder Scribe. Brian Braddock was sent by Shinobi Shaw to find Mountjoy. Mountjoy, hiding in Scribe's body, would confide in Braddock and pose as his ally. When the Inner Circle's plans were revealed, and Braddock donned his Captain Britain costume, Mountjoy and the Black Queen Ms. Steed attacked Captain Britain. After Steed was defeated, Mountjoy tried to escape. Captain Britain caught up with him and knocked him out. Mountjoy and the Inner Circle were then put in jail.

Mountjoy, still in Scribe's body, was bailed out of jail by Sebastian Shaw. Taken to Liberty Island, Mountjoy was put in a duel against Madelyne Pryor. Using Scribe's powers, Mountjoy nearly defeated Madelyne and closed in for the kill. Madelyne then reached inside Scribe and pulled out Mountjoy, defeating him. Mountjoy's current whereabouts are unknown. However, it is known that he retained his mutant powers after M-Day.

Powers and abilities
Mountjoy can merge his body into another's two different ways. One is by becoming a "silent partner": His will dominates, your body remains the same, his facial features dominate and his energy is renewed. The second is by a "hostile takeover" that absorbs you, mind, body and soul while also renewing him. He also generates a basilisk field, slowing the reaction time of his victims within a five-yard area where he exerts.

References

Marvel Comics mutants
Marvel Comics supervillains